"Strong Enough" is a song by American recording artist and actress Cher from her twenty-second studio album, Believe (1998). The song was released as the second single from the album. It was released on February 22, 1999, by Warner Bros, and WEA. The song's composition and musical style is strongly reminiscent of 1970s disco music. The song received positive reviews from music critics, many calling it a highlight to Believe and comparing it to Gloria Gaynor's "I Will Survive". The song had less success in the US Billboard Hot 100, where it peaked at number fifty-seven, but did top the Billboard Hot Dance Club Play chart. It also went to number one in Hungary and into the top ten in Austria, Belgium, Finland, France, Germany, Iceland, Italy, New Zealand, Scotland, Spain, Switzerland and the UK.

Background and reception
"Strong Enough" was released as the second international single from Cher's twenty-second studio album, Believe, which was released in 1998. However it was not successful in the US until it received more airplay following the release of promotional remixes. The song, along with "Believe", has become one of her most successful songs to date.

"Strong Enough" received favorable reviews from music critics. Swedish newspaper Aftonbladet stated that the song "will be as great for the distressed" as Gloria Gaynors' "I Will Survive". Michael Gallucci from AllMusic wrote that "Cher herself merely moves through the beat factory with one drab vocal range, blending butt-shaker." Randy Cordova from The Arizona Republic described the song as a "thumping retro-disco tune". Larry Flick from Billboard wrote that it "picks up right where "Believe" left off." He noted that the "retro-disco" song is "irresistibly catchy, jubilant as a prayer revival, and an ideal partner as kids prepare to buddy up with radio as school finishes up. Everything about this anthemic track is obvious from the rust listen: Cher is again in peak form, set in front of a string-laden, thump-happy beat that will have folks tapping toes and snapping fingers from Maine to Minnesota." He also added that "no doubt, this is the biggest no-brainer hit we've heard this year." Matt Stopera and Brian Galindo from BuzzFeed commented, "Always overshadowed by "Believe", "Strong Enough" was also a great '90s dance song!" The Daily Vault's Michael R. Smith said that "this is the most comfortable and relaxed she has ever sounded musically." A reviewer from Irish Independent picked it as one of the "highlights" from the Believe album, noting it as "rousing". Deborah Wilker from Knight Ridder said "Strong Enough" is the best song of the album, calling it a "catchy feminist chant" and "her very own "I Will Survive"".

Chart performance
"Strong Enough" had peaked at number fifty-seven on the US Billboard Hot 100, staying in the charts for twelve weeks. The song did not receive much attention in the United States, but when the promo remixes were released, the song had peaked at number one on the Billboard Hot Dance Club Play. It also peaked at number thirty-one on the Billboard Pop Songs, number twenty-nine on the Billboard Hot Adult Contemporary Tracks and number forty on the Billboard Hot Adult Top 40 Tracks.

Elsewhere, the song was successful, mostly getting in the top ten in most countries. The song had peaked at number six in New Zealand, and also peaked at number eleven in Australia. The song was also very well received in Europe. The song peaked at number one in Hungary, and had also peaked at number seven in Finland, until falling out the third week and number three in France, staying in the charts for twenty-four weeks. The song had also peaked at number twenty-one in Sweden, five in Switzerland, four in Austria, eleven in The Netherlands and sixteen in Norway. The song also debuted at number five on the UK Singles Chart, until descending the rest of the way, finally finishing at number fifty-six.

Music video

The accompanying music video for "Strong Enough" was directed by British director Nigel Dick and was released worldwide in early 1999. A promo VHS tape and CD-R were also released in the US, but are very rare. The video promo also includes the remixed version of the video.

In this video, Cher is a computer virus and her role is an advisor who tells a bad boyfriend the reasons why his girlfriend (played by Shannyn Sossamon) will leave him. Teens in a party, two women, two robbers and many gothic instrument players also appear in the video.

A couple of months after the release of the original music video for Strong Enough, Dan-O-Rama (best known for his work remixing videos) created the "vocal club edit" video for this song. He used the "Strong Enough" Pumpin' Dolls Vocal Epic club remix and Club 69 Future edit promo only for DJs in 2000. The original music video is also featured on 'The Very Best Of Cher: The Video Hits Collection'

Legacy
In 2020, the Chicago Tribune listed "Strong Enough" as one of the "25 Pride anthems of all time", and stated that "one could easily interpret the lyrics to be about a repressive society that she is no longer willing to tolerate."

Track listings

US maxi-CD single
 "Strong Enough" (album version) – 3:44
 "Strong Enough" (Club 69 Future Anthem mix) – 11:00
 "Strong Enough" (Pumpin' Dolls Vocal Epic club) – 7:22
 "Strong Enough" (male version) – 3:32
 "Strong Enough" (Club 69 Phunk mix) – 8:32
 "Strong Enough" (Mark Andrews remix edit) – 7:31
 "Strong Enough" (Pumpin' Dolls Cashmere club mix) – 8:34
 "Strong Enough" (D-Bop's Melt mix) – 7:49
 "Strong Enough" (Club 69 Future Anthem short mix edit) – 8:39
 "Strong Enough" (Pumpin' Dolls radio edit) – 3:48

US 2×12-inch single
A1. "Strong Enough" (Club 69 Future Anthem mix) – 11:00
A2. "Strong Enough" (album version) – 3:44
B1. "Strong Enough" (Club 69 Phunk mix) – 8:32
B2. "Strong Enough" (Mark Andrews remix edit) – 7:31
C1. "Strong Enough" (Pumpin' Dolls Vocal Epic club) – 7:22
C2. "Strong Enough" (D-Bop's Melt mix) – 7:49
C3. "Strong Enough" (male version) – 3:32
D1. "Strong Enough" (Pumpin' Dolls Cashmere club mix) – 8:34
D2. "Strong Enough" (Club 69 Future Anthem short mix edit) – 8:39

UK CD1
 "Strong Enough" – 3:44
 "Strong Enough" (Club 69 Future Anthem short mix edit) – 8:39
 "Strong Enough" (Mark Andrews remix edit) – 7:31

UK CD2
 "Strong Enough" – 3:44
 "Strong Enough" (male version) – 3:32
 "Strong Enough" (D-Bop's Melt mix) – 7:49

UK cassette single
 "Strong Enough" – 3:44
 "Strong Enough" (Club 69 Future Anthem short mix) – 8:56

European CD single
 "Strong Enough" – 3:44
 "Strong Enough" (Pumpin' Dolls radio edit) – 3:48

Australian CD single
 "Strong Enough" – 3:44
 "Believe" (Club 69 Phunk club mix) – 6:50
 "Strong Enough" (Club 69 Future Anthem short mix) – 8:40
 "Strong Enough" (Mark Andrews remix edit) – 7:31
 "Strong Enough" (D-Bop Melt mix) – 7:49

Charts and certifications

Weekly charts

Year-end charts

Certifications and sales

Release history

Notable cover versions
 British pop group Steps covered the song live and added to their concert setlist, which is performed along with "Stomp".

References

External links
 Official Cher site
 Warner official site
 

1998 singles
1999 singles
Cher songs
Number-one singles in Hungary
Disco songs
Music videos directed by Nigel Dick
Songs with feminist themes
Songs written by Mark Taylor (record producer)
Songs written by Paul Barry (songwriter)
Song recordings produced by Mark Taylor (record producer)
1998 songs
Warner Records singles